Karen Davidson may refer to:

 Karen Davidson (athlete), former British wheelchair athlete
 Karen Lynn Davidson (born 1943), Latter-day Saint hymnwriter, author and literary critic